Yury Kharchenko (Russian Юрий Харченко, born 1986 in Moscow, Soviet Union) is a Russian German artist. He lives and works in Berlin.

Life

Raised in Moscow and West Germany he took private art lessons by Ukrainian artist and Russian-language poet Vilen Barskyi. From 2004 - 2008 he studied at the famous Kunstakademie Düsseldorf by Markus Lüpertz and Siegfried Anzinger and graduated with master of fine arts and Diploma. From 2011 - 2012 he was in a PhD programme at the University of Potsdam and did a research about the art philosophy in postmodern times influenced by Jacques Derrida and Emmanuel Levinas.

His works are part of important museum collections like Museum Kunstpalast Düsseldorf, State Collection Düsseldorf, Kunst aus NRW Aachen and Felix Nussbaum Haus Osnabrück.

Work

Yury Kharchenko’s works can make one forget that such a thing as pop art and post modernism ever existed. His pictures are completely free of cynicism, and there is nothing second-hand about them. His painting is not that of an epigone. They focus on the formal and emotional possibilities of painting. They are both non-representational - pure visual phenomena like sounds – and representational - simple shapes such as the houses,   which form the backbone of the cycle, or as the silhouettes of figures hidden in the thickets and scrub of the dark lattice structure of these pictorial spaces. Yury Kharchenko’s paintings are delightful in their texture and their sense of color, stimulating the senses and arousing strong feelings in the viewer.

In order to endure the turbulence on this journey within the picture and to domesticate the overwhelming flood of free forms and fleeing forces, Kharchenko has provided his recent works with a frame. For this purpose he selects the archetype of a house in order to, as he says, "hold the painting together" with this shape. As Kharchenko says, "paintings must also take on shape.” Thus, this superordinate structure is like a metaphorical roof which delimits and holds together the representation of painting and is not a painted representation of a house! This taming of an undirected drive by way of an organizing form reflects the duality of human nature, which Friedrich Nietzsche described with the principles of the Apollonian and Dionysian. Accordingly, the Apollonian strives for form and shape, while the Dionysian follows the intoxication and the creative drive that breaks all form.  By using the house, although a symbol of protection and security, Kharchenko does not attempt to abolish this conflict, which is inherent in any creative work, but rather, to endure it and, above all, to visualize it through painting.

Nevertheless, a problem arises of spectator subjectivity. Namely, intuiting momentarily the physical properties and emotional directives of a work differs categorically from shaping and impressing them with one’s own hands: the role of seer is necessarily passive in relation to that of maker. However, the starting point of an individual confronting the concrete work coheres with Marx’s preferred hermeneutic. “In direct contrast to German philosophy which descends from heaven to earth, here we ascend from earth to heaven. That is to say, we do not set out from what men say, imagine, conceive, nor from men as narrated, thought of, imagined, conceived, in order to arrive at men in the flesh.” The individual who addresses the artwork effects his own activity, turning himself into a person who thinks deeper about the design before him or walks away. “We set out from real, active men, and on the basis of their real life-process we demonstrate the development of the ideological reflexes and echoes of this life-process.”

Exhibitions (selection) 

 2017
Felix Nussbaum Haus, Osnabrück (solo)

 2016
Jewish Museum of Westphalia (solo)
 Nordheimer Scheune | Helmut A. Müller, Nordheim (solo)

 2015
 Clara Maria Sels Gallery, Düsseldorf
 Christie' s at K 21, Düsseldorf
 Mirta Demare Gallery, Rotterdam
 Bonnefanten, Roermond
 Ober Gallery, USA
 Jagla Ausstellungsraum, Cologne

 2014
Clara Maria Sels Gallery with Ilya Kabakov, Panamarenko, Duane Michals, Francesca Woodman
Kunstverein Dillingen with Thomas Huber
Ober Gallery with Jasper Johns, AR Penck, Donald Baechler

 2013
 Galerie Clara Maria Sels, Düsseldorf
 Mirta Demare Gallery, Rotterdam
 Gerhard Hofland Gallery, Amsterdam
 FRISCH, Halle am Wasser, Berlin
 Ober Gallery, Kent, Connecticut, USA
 Gene Shapiro Auctions New York, USA
 Museum Kunstpalast Düsseldorf

 2012
 Chaplini Gallery, Köln
 Jerusalem Artists House, Jerusalem
 Kunstraum Kreuzberg/Bethanien, Berlin
 Ben Uri Gallery, London
 Kunst aus Nordrhein-Westfalen Sammlung Aachen
 Museum Kunstpalast Düsseldorf

 2011
 Museum Kunstpalast Düsseldorf

 2010
 Förderkoje, Art Cologne mit Michal Budny, Anja Schwörer, Michael Wutz, Zenita Komad, Eli Cortinas, Rebecca Wilton, Vera Lossau

 2009
 Otto Schweins Gallery, Cologne
 Jiri Svestka Gallery, Prague
 Russian Salon, Project of Art Cologne at Excelsior Hotel Ernst with Vadim Zakharov, Anna Parkina, Leonid Sokhranski

 2008
 Kunstmuseum Walter
 Galerie Noah

 2007
 Tris Vonna-Michell / Yury Kharchenko
 European Kunsthalle Project
 Galerie Otto Schweins, Köln
 Shuebbe Projects, Düsseldorf

2006
 Christie's in Kunstsammlung Nordrhein-Westfalen, Düsseldorf

Publications 
 Worlds Within. Kerber Verlag, Berlin 2013, .
 Journey to Jerusalem. Kerber Verlag, Berlin, 2013, .
 Die Grosse Kunstausstellung NRW, Museum Kunstpalast, Düsseldorf, 2013
 Extra Verlag, Berlin, 2012, .
 Olaf Salié (Hrsg.): Rising Young Artists to keep an Eye on. Daab, Köln 2011, .
 Boesner GmbH (Hrsg.) "Kunstwelten", Boesner, Witten, 2011, BestellNr.: 9783928003001
 Leonardo Art award, Kunstmuseum Walter, Augsburg, 2008
 Extra Verlag, Berlin 2008, .

References

External links 
 Yury Kharchenko at Barnes & Noble, New York 
 Literature about Yury Kharchenko at the catalogue of Deutschen Nationalbibliothek
 
 Yury Kharchenko bei Artfacts.net
 Galerie Clara Maria Sels, Düsseldorf
 Mirta Demare Gallery, Rotterdam
 Ober Gallery, CT, USA
 Website of the artist
 New York Times
 Tagesspiegel
 Kölnische Rundschau
 The Millbrook Independent
 Monopol Magazin
 TV Vernissage
 Kerber Verlag
 Galerie Philia, Paris

Contemporary painters
Postmodern artists
21st-century Russian painters
Russian male painters
21st-century German painters
21st-century German male artists
German male painters
Living people
1986 births
German abstract artists
Artists from Moscow
Artists from Berlin
Kunstakademie Düsseldorf alumni
21st-century Russian male artists